You Give Me Something may refer to:

"You Give Me Something" (Jamiroquai song), 2001
"You Give Me Something" (James Morrison song), 2006